Taman Len Seng is a township in Cheras, Kuala Lumpur, Malaysia.

Suburbs in Kuala Lumpur